Pimelabditus moli is a species of long-whiskered catfish native to French Guiana and Suriname where it is found in the Maroni River basin.  This species grows to a length of  SL.

References 

 

Pimelodidae
Fish described in 2009
Fish of French Guiana
Fish of Suriname